The fourteenth season of Law & Order: Special Victims Unit debuted with a two-part premiere episode on September 26, 2012, at 9pm/8c - 11pm/10c (Eastern) on NBC, which was the show's weekly time slot.

The fourteenth season picked up storyline-wise where the last season left off, with Captain Cragen (Dann Florek) awaking to a dead sex worker in his bed with her throat slit. The two-part season premiere was watched by 7.19 million total viewers and received generally positive reviews. The series' landmark 300th episode fell this season and aired on October 24, 2012, watched by 6.77 million total viewers. This is the first season of SVU to have any kind of crossover with now-ended Law & Order spinoff Law & Order: Criminal Intent, with Kathryn Erbe guest starring in two episodes "Acceptable Loss" and "Poisoned Motive" as her LOCI character, Alexandra Eames, and Denis O'Hare guest starring in the episode "Presumed Guilty" as his LOCI character, Father Shea.

Production
Law & Order: Special Victims Unit was renewed for a fourteenth season on May 9, 2012. Prior to the season fourteen renewal, cast members Ice-T (Detective Fin Tutuola) and Mariska Hargitay (Detective Olivia Benson) had already renewed their contracts through the fourteenth season. Ice-T announced on Twitter that filming on the fourteenth season began on Monday, July 23, 2012.

In May 2012, show runner/executive producer Warren Leight said that the story line for season fourteen would pick up where the thirteenth-season finale left off: "In fact, there were a number of scenes we shot that didn't make it into this cut that may make it into the next one. ... It's good to know who did it and why, and who's pulling the strings." On July 30, 2012, Leight confirmed the season premiere would be a two-part episode and Leight told Today, after talking about the returning guest stars from "Rhodium Nights": "We may want to do more of that this season," he said. The issue, he pointed out, is "how do you distinguish the 294th episode of 'SVU' from the others? I wanted to give people a reason to come back to season 14. The show deserves a good cliffhanger, and I loved reading people's responses after the finale ended -- 'Did they just do that?'" Leight continued, "People have us in a box," he said, "and I want them to see that the show is a little more adventurous than they might have remembered." In September, Leight said in an interview with TV Guide that this season's theme would revolve around "everybody having secrets".

On September 17, 2012, both Mariska Hargitay and Danny Pino tweeted that filming on SVU episode 300 started. Mariska tweeted "Can't believe we started filming our 300 episode today! #svu" and Pino tweeted with, "Congrats on 300 SVU's. Proud 2 contribute 28 to the tally. #quality&quantity".

Production on season 14 of Law & Order: SVU (along with other New York City based TV series) was halted by NBC starting October 29, 2012 in the wake of Hurricane Sandy. Show runner/executive producer Warren Leight tweeted on October 30, "SVU cast and crew seem to be safe. Our stages, and many of us, in the dark. Our thoughts and prayers to all suffering in Sandy's wake". Ice-T tweeted on November 1, 2012, "SANDY Update: SVU production shut down all week. No power on set." Law & Order: SVUs home studio on Chelsea Piers had water damage and a loss of electrical power; according to a note on the complex's website, "The city has not issued any location permits this week, so probably the earliest we'll be able to shoot is this weekend," said Warren Leight to NECN. "We are able to do some location scouting tomorrow (November 2, 2012) and we have our production meetings by phone, with people on their cells and calling from their cars. The main issue is going to be getting power restored." Mayor Michael Bloomberg's office said it would not issue permits for outdoor filming in the city's five boroughs until at least Friday, citing concerns about safety and the ongoing cleanup.

Ice-T tweeted on November 2, 2012: "Just made it to the SVU set on location in Riverdale NY. My trailer has power, TV and heat. I need to take this MF home!" Leight posted a tweet quoting the poem "Invictus" earlier in the day, "#SVU cast and crew somehow resumed shooting this morning. We are muddied but unbowed." At the production blog on the official website, they note the storm hit while episodes "Lessons Learned", and "Dream Deferred" were being shot; they couldn't get back into the studio or production office for weeks due to flooding.

On December 6, 2012, NBC ordered an additional two episodes for this season, bringing the total to 24. The season finale aired on May 22, 2013.

Cast

Main cast
 Mariska Hargitay as Senior Detective Olivia Benson
 Danny Pino as Junior Detective Nick Amaro
 Kelli Giddish as Junior Detective Amanda Rollins
 Richard Belzer as Senior Detective Sergeant John Munch
 Ice-T as Senior Detective Odafin "Fin" Tutuola
 Dann Florek as Captain Donald "Don" Cragen

Special guest star
 Carolyn McCormick as Dr. Elizabeth Olivet
 BD Wong as FBI Special Agent Dr. George Huang

Recurring cast

 Raúl Esparza as Assistant District Attorney Rafael Barba
 Tamara Tunie as Medical Examiner Dr. Melinda Warner
 Dean Winters as Detective Brian Cassidy 
 Adam Baldwin as Interim  Captain Steven Harris
 Reg E. Cathey as Defense Attorney Barry Querns
 Elizabeth Marvel as Defense Attorney Rita Calhoun
 Michael Mastro as Judge Serani
 Ami Brabson as Judge Karyn Blake
 Allison Fernandez as Zara Amaro
 Andrea Navedo as Cynthia Mancheno
 Jaden Matthew Rodriguez as Gil Mancheno

 Kathryn Erbe as Homeland Security Task Force Lieutenant Alexandra Eames
 Lindsay Pulsipher as Kim Rollins
 Sue Simmons as Newscaster Sue Simmons
 Jeffrey Tambor as Defense Attorney Ben Cohen
 Sue Kim as Detective Emily Ling
 Stephen C. Bradbury as Judge Colin McNamara
 Jessica Phillips as Assistant District Attorney Pippa Cox
 Steve Rosen as Defense Attorney Michael Guthrie
 Sonia Manzano as Judge Gloria Pepitone 
 Max Baker as Colin Bennett
 Karen Tsen Lee as Medical Examiner Susan Chung
 Scott William Winters as Detective Robert Dumas

Guest stars

Dean Winters, who came back in "Rhodium Nights" to portray Detective Brian Cassidy, returned for the season premiere episodes, along with guest stars Peter Jacobson (Bart Ganzel), Pippa Black (Carrissa Gibson), Ron Rifkin (Defense Attorney Marvin Exley), Brooke Smith (Delia Wilson), and Laura Benanti as Marie Amaro. On January 4, 2013, Warren Leight tweeted the Cassidy character (Dean Winters) may appear again in the spring.

Paget Brewster guest starred as Paula Foster, the Bureau Chief ADA of the Public Integrity Unit in the District Attorney's office. Her character is assigned to the case against Captain Cragen (Dann Florek), who is suspected of murder after what occurred in the episode "Rhodium Nights", in which Cragen woke up with a dead prostitute (Pippa Black) in his bed. Brewster has guest starred on SVU before, in the eighth season episode, "Scheherazade", as the daughter of an elderly dying man, believed to be a murderer. Brewster's character installs an interim commanding officer, Captain Steven Harris (portrayed by Adam Baldwin), while Cragen is suspended and under investigation. Sue Simmons also guest starred in the season premiere episodes as herself. "It’s a big scandal within the world we’ve created, there’s a dead hooker in the captain’s bed, and we go to a newscaster to help us understand the story," said show runner/executive producer Warren Leight, "Sue opens the episode doing a news standup from outside 1 Police Plaza. We’ll bring her back for the second episode of the two-parter."

Roger Bart, Anna Chlumsky and Raúl Esparza guest starred in the episode "Twenty-Five Acts." Chlumsky plays the author of a best-selling erotic novel, who accuses a high-profile talk show host (Roger Bart) of a brutal rape. However, the SVU squad gets suspicious when they discover her account of the rape mimics the chapters in her book. The squad, along with the DA's office (Raúl Esparza as ADA Barba), also struggles to keep the case from turning into a media frenzy. Kathryn Erbe guest starred in the episode "Acceptable Loss" as her Law & Order: Criminal Intent character, Detective Alexandra Eames, who is now working for a joint City/Federal Homeland Security Task Force (and promoted to Lieutenant), Eames crosses paths with the SVU squad when their investigation of a sex trafficking ring uncovers a connection to terrorists. Warren Leight tweeted Erbe would be in the fourth episode of the season.

Tom Sizemore, Hamish Linklater, and Alex Karpovsky guest starred in the 300th episode of Law & Order: Special Victims Unit, titled "Manhattan Vigil". Longtime fans will be happy to know contains many nods to the series' pilot — Linklater played a man from a successful real estate family whose son goes missing. Show runner/executive producer Warren Leight told TV Line, about Linklater's character, "His family is involved in the gentrification of Morningside Heights," where some of the episode is set, Leight said. Karpovsky portrayed an auxiliary police officer, and Sizemore played a man employed by Linklater's character's family. Lindsay Pulsipher portrayed Kim Rollins, Detective Amanda Rollins' (Kelli Giddish) troubled sister in the episode "Friending Emily". Pulsipher will be in more than one episode in this season.

Scott Bakula guest starred in the episode "Vanity's Bonfire" as a lawyer who's being considered for the U.S. Supreme Court and is accused of fathering a child outside of marriage. "People might make the comparisons to John Edwards," Warren Leight said, referring to the onetime Democratic hopeful who admitted to having a child with his mistress. Elliott Gould and Charles Grodin guest starred in the episode "Lessons Learned", which is inspired by the Penn State child sex abuse scandal and Jerry Sandusky. On November 20, 2012, showrunner/EP Warren Leight tweeted that along with Gould and Grodin; Buck Henry, Frank Wood, Robert Sella, Anthony Rapp, and Elizabeth Marvel would also be guest starring in "Lessons Learned".

Patricia Arquette and Anne Meara guest starred as daughter and mother in the SVU episode "Dreams Deferred". The episode revolved around an armed and dangerous man who goes on a killing spree with Arquette's Jeannie - a prostitute with whom he has a long-standing relationship - representing the last person he calls. When Jeannie goes missing, the SVU is tasked with convincing their NYPD cohorts that her life is worth saving. Meara played Jeannie's mother, Irene, who worries for her daughter's health and safety. The duo joined previously announced guest star Jason Gedrick in the episode. Denis O'Hare guest starred in "Presumed Guilty" as Father Shea, a priest who is pulled from his car and brutally beaten. O'Hare played Father Shea in the Law & Order: Criminal Intent episode "Last Rites" under showrunner/executive producer Warren Leight in 2008. This marks O'Hare's second stint on SVU, following an appearance in 2000. He guest-starred on the original Law & Order four times, most recently in 2003 also playing a priest, Father Hogan. Erik LaRay Harvey portrayed Sam Randall, Detective Tutuola's ex-wife's brother in the episode. Despite Sam's former criminal record and various stints behind bars, Fin doesn't think Sam is their man and asks his SVU partners for help getting to the bottom of the case. Theo Rossi also guest stars in the episode as Enrique Rodriguez, a working-class Catholic who is determined to seek justice for his sister when he finds that she was part of a church cover-up.

Jane Kaczmarek guest starred in the episode "Beautiful Frame", as Suffolk County District Attorney Pamela James, who lands the same murder case as ADA Barba (Raúl Esparza). However, while James arrests an SVU rape victim for the crime, Barba and the SVU team like a different suspect for the murder. The trials start simultaneously and both prosecutors must fight for a conviction before the other can destroy their case. In "Beautiful Frame", Yvonne Zima portrayed a rape victim in an SVU case who is arrested for the murder of her ex-boyfriend. Suffolk County DA Pam James (Kaczmarek) lands the case and swiftly brings charges against the young woman. Detective Benson questions the circumstances of the arrest and gathers enough evidence for ADA Barba to levy charges in Manhattan against another suspect. The two ambitious District Attorneys square off in separate trials for the same murder, hoping to get a conviction before the other derails their case. Nia Vardalos appeared in an episode titled, "Criminal Hatred," (airing January 30, 2013), Vardalos portrayed Counselor Minonna Efron, whose client is on trial for assault and murder. Vardalos' character is described as "disorganized," which makes ADA Barba (Raúl Esparza) think he's got an easy win, but the character winds up thwarting him at every turn. Victoria Rowell also guest stars and Fred Norris makes a cameo appearance.

Marcia Gay Harden returned as FBI Agent Dana Lewis in "Secrets Exhumed," (aired February 6, 2013). Agent Lewis partners with the SVU when she suspects a rape-murder case is connected to several cases across the country. This marked Harden's fourth episode on SVU. Harold Perrineau guest starred in the same episode as career criminal Brian Traymor, Jay Karnes also guest stars. The band Jane's Addiction's Dave Navarro guest starred in the episode "Funny Valentine" as a sound engineer (instead of a musician), named Ferrari who is a part of the entourage for one of hip-hop's rising stars. Ferrari witnesses a crime, but refuses to rat out his friend. Navarro hinted at his appearance on Twitter prior before TV Guide announced it, "On my way to NYC to hang out with Detective Benson for a day," he tweeted about star Mariska Hargitay. Jeffrey Tambor guest starred in "Funny Valentine" as well, in a role that's a change of pace for the actor. Tambor has been cast as Ben Cohen, an attorney hired to defend a popular hip-hop artist after his arrest by the SVU. While Tambor's TV characters are often quite bizarre, Cohen is described as being no-nonsense and perhaps a bit overconfident in the popularity of his star client in court.

BD Wong guest starred as Dr. George Huang in the 19th episode entitled "Born Psychopath". This was Wong's second appearance on the show after his departure in season 12.

Eion Bailey guest starred in the episode, "Traumatic Wound" (May 1, 2013), as former Military veteran, who might hold the key to why as a young girl who was attacked at a concert. Jeffrey Tambor reprised his role as attorney, Ben Cohen, in this episode.

In the May 8 episode, Fin's Narcotics past caught up with him, when a friend (2 Chainz) needed a helping hand and landed Fin in trouble, which prompted a return visit for Kathryn Erbe as Lt. Alexandra Eames. This episode also guest starred: Emilio Rivera, Yul Vazquez and Cathy Moriarty.

Richard Thomas starred in the May 15 episode, "Brief Interlude", as a husband and father, whose wife, Kerry Butler, was attacked while attending music festivals in New York City.

Pablo Schreiber and Lauren Ambrose guest star in the season finale (May 22), that starts out as a routine arrest by Detective Rollins and ends up becoming much worse.

Mike Tyson casting controversy

On January 10, 2013, NBC announced that former boxer Mike Tyson had been cast to guest star in the episode "Monster's Legacy"(which also stars Ed Asner). Due to Mike Tyson's rape conviction in 1992, this triggered a series of protests by fans and sexual assault survivors, who felt that a TV series whose goal is partly to speak out against sex crimes should not help boost the career of a convicted rapist.

At least three Change.org petitions were created to convince NBC to reverse the decision, the most popular one started by Marcie Kaveney. On January 19, 2013, Pauley Perrette, a star of NCIS, a fan of SVU and a rape survivor herself, stated her disapproval of the casting choice on Twitter. She included a link to Kaveney's petition which caused the number of signatures to shoot up to over 15,000. In an interview with The Wrap Kaveney revealed that "As soon as I saw it, I was just floored by the news, 'SVU' is a show I've followed for a long time... I think survivors consider this their show" and stated, "I don't know if it's for ratings or to clean up Mike Tyson's image." In response to the plot summary of "Monster's Legacy" she also opined that giving Tyson this particular sympathetic role is a form of rape apology. "It's kind of being a rape apologist, saying 'Maybe he's had this violent childhood and that's why he's become this violent person.'"

Further criticism came from Lindy West of Jezebel who wrote on January 25, 2013 that an appearance by Mike Tyson would be hypocritical to the message of the show: "In addition to being a colossal display of poor taste, Mike Tyson playing a murderer on SVU is directly counter to the implied mission of the show. Either you're a genuine advocate for victims, or you don't give a shit. You don't get to do both." On the same day, the Joyful Heart Foundation released a statement apologizing to the viewers who feel betrayed. While the executives of the JHF reiterated that they have no say over the production of SVU episodes, they indicated that "We were not aware of this casting choice and we have formally expressed our concerns to the executives and producers at SVU." Despite being the foundation's president, the personal opinion of Mariska Hargitay, whose contract with NBC contains a publicity clause, was not mentioned.

Warren Leight began responding to the controversy on January 12, 2013, by writing a seven-part tweet "We understand the casting of Mike Tyson seems inappropriate to some SVU fans. While in no way excusing his past actions, it's worth noting MT was convicted over twenty years ago, and served his time. In recent years he has found sobriety, and started a foundation to meet the comprehensive needs of children from broken homes. The episode itself deals with many issues, including the ongoing effects of childhood abuse, the possibility of rehabilitation, and the potential for disastrous results when individuals and/or the justice system pre-judge or fail to contextualize. Because of SVU's subject matter, all of us have a profound sense of our responsibility. Our intent, as always, is to provoke discussion and awareness. We ask you to keep an open mind. Thanks." On January 21, 2013 after receiving further complaints, he followed up with "...please know that I’ve heard you. When tweets become harassment, I will have to block. Thnx."

Mike Tyson, who had already made his excitement known in a tweet, shared his thoughts about the role in a subsequent interview. This took place on January 29, 2013, after the petition against his casting had gained momentum. Viewing his character as a separate person and not a fictionalized version of himself, Tyson said, "I have no emotional connection to the role. As a human being I can relate to it, but it has nothing to do with me." He also mentioned being a fan of SVU, calling it "the most exciting show on TV" and saying "My wife [Lakiha Spicer, whom he wed in 2009] and I looked on this show a lot, especially when I was going through my relapse and drug periods." In response to the criticism, Tyson maintained, as he has since 1992, that he was innocent of raping Desiree Washington. With the filming of his episode complete, he also commented that Mariska Hargitay was "very quiet" on the set of SVU.

Adding to the controversy surrounding the casting choice was that the air date originally planned, February 13, 2013, coincided with One Billion Rising, a global movement to end violence against women and girls. On January 30, NBC switched "Monster's Legacy" with "Secrets Exhumed" so that Tyson's episode would air on February 6 instead. Four days before the episode, Law & Order creator Dick Wolf announced that he supported NBC's decision to produce the episode and hire Mike Tyson to guest star. This angered fans, as he did not acknowledge any of the petitions or ethical concerns. "Monster's Legacy" aired on February 6, 2013, becoming Mike Tyson's first acting appearance not playing himself.

"Monster's Legacy" continued to be a point of discussion in the years that followed with Megan Garber of The Atlantic calling the casting of Mike Tyson "one significant lapse of judgement". Dylan Matthews, while having positive reviews of the episode, wrote that the "stunt casting" was unnecessary.

Episodes

Ratings
Law & Order: Special Victims Unit was moved back to NBC Wednesdays at 9:00PM (Eastern)/8:00PM (Central) for the 2012-13 network television season, its lead-ins being new comedies, Guys with Kids and Animal Practice (which was canceled by NBC on October 18, 2012, Whitney replacing it in November). SVU weekly airs up against the American Broadcasting Company (ABC) comedies Modern Family and Suburgatory with FOX's The X Factor and in the Winter, American Idol, Supernatural on CW, and CBS's veteran drama Criminal Minds (this occurring for the third time SVU has been pushed back to 9:00PM (Eastern).

Season fourteen premiered (episodes: "Lost Reputation & Above Suspicion") fairly well earning approximately 7.19 million total viewers with a 2.1 in the age 18-49 demographic with a 6% share. The series' 300th episode ("Manhattan Vigil") was watched by approximately 6.77 million total viewers and earned a 1.9 in the age 18-49 demographic with a 5% share. Leading into Thanksgiving, SVU saw a sharp decline in the 18-49 demographic with the episode "Lesson's Learned", which earned a 1.3 with a 4% share, it rebounded to 1.6 in the 18-49 age demo with a 4% share with its fall finale episode, "Dreams Deferred"; in the first half-hour the comedy Modern Family on ABC was a repeat. SVU surged at the start of 2013 with the episode "Presumed Guilty", to 7.73 million total viewers and a 2.2 in the age 18-49 demo with a 6% share, coming in first place in its time slot; NBC and FOX being the only networks that night airing original episodes; ABC, CBS, and CW aired repeats. The following week, "Beautiful Frame" saw a series high in overall viewership in over a year with 8.42 million total viewers.

As of December 6, 2012, SVU averaged a 1.7 18-49 rating in Live+same day that Fall, airing with virtually no lead-in (NBC's struggling Wednesday comedy block), SVU had improved its challenging Wednesday 9 PM slot by 55% in adults 18-49 year-to-year but the network aired the now-defunct Harry's Law in the hour last fall. In Live+7, SVU averaged a 2.6/7 in 18-49 and 8.6 million viewers this season up to that point.

References

External links
 Official episode guide
 Season 14 episodes at TVGuide.com
 Season 14 episodes at MSN.com
 Season 14 episodes at IMDb.com

14
2012 American television seasons
2013 American television seasons